Steffen Kielstrup (born 18 October 1984) is a Danish coach and retired professional football player. He is currently the assistant coach of Vejle Boldklub.

Kielstrup has played in Vejle since the age of six but is due to move to Horsens in the summer of 2012 after having signed a 3-year contract.

Playing career
Already at the age of six Steffen Kielstrup joined Vejle Boldklub and played all his youth years in the club. He made his debut on the first team on 6 May 2001 only 16 years old. At that time he had played six matches on the Denmark national under-17 football team, and was considered a talent with a great future ahead as a footballer. Since then Kielstrup has represented the Denmark national youth teams every year, playing 18 matches, and is still representing Vejle Boldklub on the club side.

In his time in Vejle Boldklub he has been used as an allround player, playing all positions in the defense and as a central midfielder. Especially in the season of 07/08 where he and Vejle Boldklub secured promotion to the best Danish league, for the third time in his professional career, Kielstrup did not have a regular role on the team. Even though he played nearly every game and the club secured a record breaking 78 points out of 90, he was not satisfied with his role.

Coaching career

Vejle Boldklub
After Kielstrup retired in the summer 2017 due to injuries, he was appointed as the new U17 coach. One year later, he took charge of the U19s.

Kielstrup was U19 manager until June 2021, where he was promoted as an assistant coach for the first team under manager Carit Falch.

References

External links

 Danish national team profile

1984 births
Living people
Danish men's footballers
Denmark under-21 international footballers
Denmark youth international footballers
Vejle Boldklub players
Vejle Boldklub Kolding players
AC Horsens players
Danish Superliga players
Danish 1st Division players
Association football midfielders
Association football defenders